Royal Air Force Abingdon or more simply RAF Abingdon was a Royal Air Force station near Abingdon, Oxfordshire. It is now known as Dalton Barracks and is used by the Royal Logistic Corps.

History
The airfield was opened in 1932, initially as a training station for RAF Bomber Command.

On 16 November 1933 HQ Central Area moved to RAF Abingdon. It was disbanded by being renamed No. 1 (Bomber) Group RAF on 1 May 1936.

Second World War
Orders arrived on 24-25 August 1939 to mobilise the squadrons at Abingdon prior to proceeding to France as part of the Advanced Air Striking Force (AASF). On receipt of orders to move to France, Headquarters No. 1 Group became Headquarters AASF and the station headquarters and the two Fairey Battle squadrons (one of which was No. 15 Squadron) at Abingdon became No. 71 (Bomber) Wing RAF. As noted in the table below, two Battle squadrons departed for France on 2 September.

No. 10 Operational Training Unit RAF was based at the airfield from April 1940 until 1946. From 1940 to 1942, Abingdon's station commander was Herbert Massey.

1945–1960
After the Second World War RAF Abingdon became part of RAF Transport Command, and also became the home of No. 1 Parachute Training School RAF which is now stationed at RAF Brize Norton. The Parachute Training School, and RAF Abingdon generally, featured heavily in the 1953 Alan Ladd film The Red Beret (called Paratrooper in the USA), and the Parachute Training School was used as a location for some scenes for the films Carve Her Name With Pride (1958) and Operation Crossbow (1965) as well as the French comedy Babette s'en va-t-en guerre (1959) which starred Brigitte Bardot. On 14 June 1968 Queen Elizabeth II conducted a royal review at RAF Abingdon to mark the 50th anniversary of the RAF.

About 1948–49 Headquarters No. 47 Group RAF, Transport Command, was at RAF Abingdon. The station, its personnel and aircraft (Yorks and Hastings) were involved in the Berlin Airlift.

In 1952 a ferry unit was based at RAF Abingdon. It moved Mosquito, Hornet, Meteor, Vampire and Spitfire aircraft. 15 Sabres were ferried from Canada but only 12 arrived. After checks and servicing the Sabres went to RAF Germany.

In 1953 all flying units dispersed to other units to make way for Nos. 24 and 47 Squadrons operating Handley Page Hastings Mks 1, 2 and 4. The three Mk 4 Hastings ("shiny fleet") belonged to 24 Squadron, serialled WD324, 326 and 500.

Also 1953, RAF Abingdon received the freedom of Abingdon.

On 22 April 1953 the spy George Blake arrived at RAF Abingdon, back from Korea via Moscow and Berlin.

In 1955 47 Squadron changed its Hastings for the Blackburn Beverley. Later 24 Squadron moved to RAF Colerne. It was replaced by No. 53 Squadron RAF operating the Beverley.

1961–1992
Besides London University Air Squadron, the Oxford University Air Squadron was based at RAF Abingdon. Abingdon was also the home of No. 6 AEF (Air Experience Flight) operating between 6 and 8 DHC Chipmunks for ATC/CCF Air Cadet flight experience training. 6 AEF was one of a very few locations that offered air cadets the "Air Cadet Navigator" training course, leading to the award of Cadet Navigation Wings.

In the late 1960s the Blackburn Beverleys' hangars had dormer extensions put in the roof to take the extra height of the tailplane of the Short Belfasts of No. 47 Squadron. Once the nose of the Belfast was in the hangar the nose had to be lifted to get the tail fin under the lip of the roof. The nose was then lowered and the tail fin rose up into the dormer roof for that parking position. No. 46 Squadron was also at Abingdon at this time flying Andovers, one of their roles being to support UK MAMS (United Kingdom Mobile Air Movements). A small Army Air Dispatch unit was also supported by the airfield at this time.

From 1975 through to the 1990s, Abingdon became a maintenance field, with the AMS (Aircraft Maintenance Squadron) servicing BAE Hawk, SEPECAT Jaguar, Hawker Hunter and Blackburn Buccaneer aircraft. In the early 80s the Battle of Britain Memorial Flight's Lancaster bomber spent a couple of winters at RAF Abingdon to undergo major refurbishment. During this period, RAF Abingdon was also home to the Field Repair Squadron (later Repair & Salvage Squadron) which included Aircraft Repair Flight, Aircraft Salvage and Transportation Flight (formerly 71 MU "Crash & Smash") and Battle Damage Repair Flight.

From 1986 to 1988 RAF Abingdon became home to the Thames Valley Police Air Support Unit, flying a helicopter on police operations. It was also the home of the London University Air Squadron in the seventies. An annual airshow took place at RAF Abingdon until the early nineties.

From 1981 many ex-airline Vickers VC10s were stored at the station following their purchase by the MoD. By the early 1990s, the aircraft were either converted to tankers or scrapped. It was intended that the 3 Air Maintenance Support (3 AMS) unit would move from RAF Brize Norton, only a few miles away, to undertake the major servicing of the VC10 military fleet. This would have involved the modification of a number of hangars to raise the roof to allow access for the VC10 high tail section at a cost of £5m.

Closure 
In July 1992 a white paper to review defence requirements "Option for Change" recommended the closure of RAF Abingdon and that a new hangar, known as "Twin Peaks" be built at RAF St Athan with the reforming of 3 AMS, from RAF Brize Norton to 1 AMS at RAF St Athan in August 1992.

RAF Abingdon closed on 31 July 1992, with the Oxford and London University Air Squadron and No. 6 Air Experience Flight moving to RAF Benson. The station was transferred to the British Army and it was renamed Dalton Barracks. RAF Benson continues to use Abingdon as a diversion airfield and for helicopter training.

Squadrons

Units
The following units were also here at some point:

Accidents and incidents
The operational training unit at RAF Abingdon suffered numerous air crashes from 1939 to 1946. Many of the crashes were close to the airfield.
 On 17 January 1941 Armstrong Whitworth Whitley V N1494 was taking off from Abingdon for a night training flight despite there being a snowstorm. The aircraft crashed in Wootton Road, killing the pilot and three other members of the crew. Two other crewmen parachuted to safety. The survivors reported that ice had caused one engine to fail.
 On 5 July 1941 Armstrong Whitworth Whitley V Z6667 was on a night training flight from Abingdon when it crashed at Chiselhampton. The cause was variously attributed to either a Luftwaffe night fighter or friendly fire by a local anti-aircraft unit. All six crew were killed.
 On 22 June 1953 Handley Page Hastings WJ335 stalled and crashed on takeoff at RAF Abingdon. The elevator control locks had been left engaged. All six crew were killed.
 On 5 March 1957 a 53 Squadron Blackburn Beverley took off from the airfield but suffered fuel starvation, tried to turn back and crashed at Sutton Wick  from the airfield. Three crew, 15 passengers (including RAF Police and six of their dogs) and two civilians on the ground were killed.
 On 6 July 1965 another RAF Handley Page Hastings took off for a parachute drop but crashed at Little Baldon, killing all 41 people aboard.
 On 23 September 1988 a Lockheed S-3 Viking failed to stop on the runway, skidded across the grass and came to a stop on Barrow road to the south of the airfield, while ferrying from USS Theodore Roosevelt.  No crew members were injured.
 On 23 September 1988 a McDonnell Douglas Phantom FGR2 crashed at the airfield while practising for the annual airshow, killing both crew (Flt Lt Chris Lackman & Flt Lt Jack Thompson).
 On 14 September 1989 a Panavia Tornado crashed near the airfield.
 On 14 June 2009 an RAF Grob Tutor and a civilian glider crashed near the airfield, killing an Air Training Corps cadet and an instructor. The glider pilot parachuted from his aircraft in time and was unharmed.

References

Citations

Bibliography

External links

 WW II Airfields of Oxfordshire

Abingdon-on-Thames
Defunct airports in England
Abingdon
Military installations closed in 1992
Airports established in 1932
Airports disestablished in 1992